The Liars is a 1996 French drama film directed by Élie Chouraqui. It was entered into the 46th Berlin International Film Festival.

Cast
 Jean-Hugues Anglade as Zac
 Valeria Bruni Tedeschi as Daisy
 Lorraine Bracco as Helene Miller
 Sami Frey as Marcus Dourmer
 Dominique Besnehard as the Casting Director
 Sophie Mounicot
 Bernard Farcy

References

External links

1996 films
French drama films
1990s French-language films
1996 drama films
Films directed by Élie Chouraqui
1990s French films